Plectranthus strigosus is a shrub from the mint family Lamiaceae, native to South Africa. The habitat includes moist forest or gully situations.

References

strigosus
Flora of South Africa
Garden plants